Janice Cousteau ( Sullivan; 5 April 1939) is the widow of undersea explorer Philippe Cousteau and joined the Cousteau team on 20 expeditions over 12 years.
 She and Philippe married in Paris. They had two children, Alexandra Cousteau and Philippe Cousteau Jr., born six months after his father's accidental death.

As of 2007, she served on the board of directors of the Washington Humane Society and is a co-founder, with her children, of EarthEcho International. She has also served on the board of directors for Alliance française.

She still takes part in occasional expeditions.

References 

1939 births
Living people
Jan
American expatriates in France